The Muses Cultural Arts Center, originally known as Orange Street Presbyterian Church, is an historic building at 428 Orange Street in Hot Springs, Arkansas. The building is a single-story brick structure, with a gable roof and concrete foundation. The front facade has a four-column Greek temple portico, with Ionic columns and a fully pedimented gable with an oculus vent at its center.

History
The church was built in 1913 by a Presbyterian congregation founded in 1903, and was known as the Orange Street Presbyterian Church. It was the congregation's third church, the first two succumbing to fire, and indebting the organization. It occupied the building until 1961, when it moved to new quarters, selling this building to the local Christian Science congregation. The building is one of Hot Springs' best examples of Classical Revival architecture. In 2013, it was announced that The Muses Project was buying the building as a home for its cultural arts center, and the church was moving to Central Avenue.

The building was listed on the National Register of Historic Places in 2002.

See also
National Register of Historic Places listings in Garland County, Arkansas

References

Presbyterian churches in Arkansas
Churches on the National Register of Historic Places in Arkansas
Neoclassical architecture in Arkansas
Churches completed in 1913
Churches in Garland County, Arkansas
Buildings and structures in Hot Springs, Arkansas
1913 establishments in Arkansas
National Register of Historic Places in Hot Springs, Arkansas
Neoclassical church buildings in the United States
Christian Science churches in the United States